George Davies (February 1900 – November 1942) was an English professional footballer who scored 18 goals in 92 appearances in the Football League playing for Birmingham and Southend United.

Davies was born in Wellington, Shropshire. He played football for Wellington St George's and Ironbridge and made guest appearances for Wrexham during the First World War, before joining Birmingham of the Football League Second Division in 1918; he was recommended to the club by Birmingham player Jack Elkes, who came from the same area. He made his debut in a 2–0 win at Wolverhampton Wanderers on 15 November 1919, and played regularly in the second half on that season. The following season, he lost his place to Ted Linley, but returned for the last eight games of the 1920–21 season to score five goals and help the club to the Second Division title. Davies played only three games in the First Division, and had a brief spell with Wellington Town before signing for Southend United of the Third Division South in June 1922. After 13 goals from 70 games in all competitions for Southend, Davies returned to Wellington Town at the end of the 1923–24 season. In June 1934 he was appointed to the club's committee.

References

1900 births
1942 deaths
People from Wellington, Shropshire
English footballers
Association football outside forwards
Wellington St George's F.C. players
Ironbridge F.C. players
Birmingham City F.C. players
Telford United F.C. players
Southend United F.C. players
English Football League players
Place of death missing